Kyle Flanagan (born 15 September 1998) is an Australian professional rugby league footballer who plays as a  for the Canterbury Bankstown Bulldogs in the NRL. 

He previously played for the Cronulla-Sutherland Sharks and the Sydney Roosters in the National Rugby League.

Background
Kyle Flanagan was born in Sydney, New South Wales, Australia on 15 September 1998. He is the son of former St. George Dragons, Western Suburbs Magpies and Parramatta Eels player and former maiden premiership-winning coach of Cronulla-Sutherland Sharks, Shane Flanagan.

Career

2018
In Round 24 of the 2018 NRL season, Flanagan made his NRL debut under the coaching of his father in the Sharks' 38–12 win over the Newcastle Knights.  On 23 September 2018, Flanagan played for Newtown in the Intrust Super Premiership NSW grand final defeat against Canterbury.

2019
In Round 13 of the 2019 NRL season, Flanagan scored 18 individual points which included a try and seven goals as Cronulla defeated Parramatta 42-22 at Shark Park.
On 22 July 2019, Flanagan signed a two-year deal to join the Sydney Roosters starting in the 2020 NRL season.

2020
In round 16 of the 2020 NRL season, he kicked nine goals in a 58-12 victory over Brisbane at the Sydney Cricket Ground.
Flanagan finished his first season with the Roosters with 4 tries and 91 goals.

Flanagan played a total of 20 games for the Sydney Roosters in the 2020 NRL season as the club finished fourth on the table.  Flanagan played in both finals games as the club were eliminated in straight sets from the finals series losing to Penrith and Canberra. In the wake of their exit from the finals, the club informed Flanagan that he would not be required for the 2021 season.

On 26 October 2020, he signed a three year deal with the Canterbury-Bankstown Bulldogs.

2021
In round 1 of the 2021 NRL season, he made his debut for Canterbury-Bankstown against Newcastle which Canterbury lost 32-16.

In round 9 of the 2021 NRL season, Flanagan was substituted off the field by Canterbury head coach Trent Barrett after a poor first half performance in the club's 32-12 loss against St. George. Flanagan was then dropped from the first grade team until the round 16 game against Manly Warringah Sea Eagles, when he was reselected after four Canterbury players were side-lined by NSW Health after breaching NRL restrictions related to COVID-19.

Flanagan made a total of 13 appearances for Canterbury in the 2021 NRL season as the club finished last and claimed the Wooden Spoon.

2022
Flanagan made a total of 20 appearances for Canterbury in the 2022 NRL season as the club finished 12th on the table and missed the finals.

2023
In round 1 of the 2023 NRL season, Flanagan was sent to the sin bin during Canterbury's 31-6 loss against Manly at Brookvale Oval.

References

External links

Cronulla Sharks profile

1998 births
Living people
Canterbury-Bankstown Bulldogs players
Cronulla-Sutherland Sharks players
Newtown Jets NSW Cup players
Rugby league five-eighths
Rugby league halfbacks
Rugby league players from Sydney
Sydney Roosters players